The 2015 Men's NORCECA Volleyball Champions Cup was the first edition of the tournament, and was held in Detroit, United States from 21 to 23 May 2015. The top two teams qualified for the 2015 FIVB Volleyball Men's World Cup. Canada won the tournament for the first time in its history.

Qualification
The hosts United States and the top three ranked teams from the NORCECA Ranking as of 1 January 2015 which had not yet qualified to the 2015 World Cup. Rankings are shown in brackets except the hosts who ranked 1st.

 (Hosts)
 (2)
 (3)
 (4)

Squads

Venue

Pool standing procedure
 Number of matches won
 Match points
 Points ratio
 Sets ratio
 Result of the last match between the tied teams

Match won 3–0: 5 match points for the winner, 0 match points for the loser
Match won 3–1: 4 match points for the winner, 1 match point for the loser
Match won 3–2: 3 match points for the winner, 2 match points for the loser

Round robin
All times are Eastern Daylight Time (UTC−04:00).

Final standing

Awards
Most Valuable Player
 Daniel Lewis

See also
2015 NORCECA Women's Champions Cup (Final Four)

References

External links
Official website
Organizer website
Regulations

qualification
NORCECA
2015 in American sports
International volleyball competitions hosted by the United States
Sports competitions in Detroit
2015 in sports in Michigan
Volleyball in Michigan